Grimpoteuthis plena is known from only one specimen, which cannot be easily separated from other species of Grimpoteuthis in the Atlantic Ocean. The specimen was in poor condition. It's similar to Grimpoteuthis wuelkeri, and may be a junior specimen of Grimpoteuthis umbellata.

Description and habitat
G. plena was found in the northwestern Atlantic Ocean, at 1,963 meters deep. Like other members of Grimpoteuthidae, it could be demersal. Specifically, the Grimpoteuthis Plena was found at a latitude of 37º 35’N and a longitude of 71º 18’W in the northwestern Atlantic Ocean along with other species of the same genus being found nearby. The G. plena was found in the year 1880 by Verrill.

The specimen's mantle reached 57 millimeters long, and its total length reached 185 millimeters. 

Some of its arms are longer than the others. There are between 55 and 60 suckers per arm, the largest of which are 2.5 millimeters in diameter. The octopus' cirri are short. Its fins are each 32 millimeters long. The eyes are small: each is 12 millimeters in diameter.

References

Octopuses
Molluscs of the Atlantic Ocean
Molluscs described in 1885
Species known from a single specimen